The Dell FX100 is the company's first thin client, advertised as a "zero client". It works in conjunction with VMware View 4.0, and uses the PC-over-IP network communication protocol with a server.
The product was announced in March 2010, and is sold through the "large enterprise" business unit.

See also 
 Desktop virtualization
 Sun Ray

References 

FX100
Thin clients